Subhreet Kaur Ghumman (born 22 April 1986) is a one-legged dancer who participated in India's Got Talent and qualified for the second level. Her nickname is 'Shubh'. She lost her leg in an accident.

Early life

Kaur, popularly known as "One Legged Dancer", is resident of Jhundan village, Amargarh, Sangrur District in Punjab. Kaur lost her leg in a road accident on 21 October 2009, while riding her scooter. She lost her leg due to her doctor's negligence.

She saw Vinod Thakur dancing on television and decided to start dancing on one leg. Shubh started practicing daily. She continued her passion for dance and she lived according to her life's motto, "Never give up..... Nothing is impossible,". Her mother Smt. Charanjeet Kaur is her role model.

Dance career
Shubh got selected in India's Got Talent TV show for her dance performance.

Her performance received a standing ovation from the Judges. Salman Khan admired her on Twitter "Wah Yaar. Hats Off. Kamaal Hai." In 2015, she became a contestant on Jhalak Dikhhla Jaa (season 8) and was impressed by the judges. She was eliminated in week 6.

Personal life
She married Yash Makkar. After two months of marriage she charged her husband with sexual harassment. Her husband claimed that she was demanding a huge amount for divorce but it was not so. He claimed everything wrong about her. She lives with her mother now and left her husband.

References

1986 births
Living people